The Bourbon Red is an American breed of domestic turkey. It is named for its reddish-brown plumage and for its area of origin, Bourbon County, Kentucky, where it was developed in the last years of the nineteenth century. It was accepted into the Standard of Perfection of the American Poultry Association in 1909, and in the early twentieth century was an important commercial meat breed until the Broad Breasted White began to dominate industrial production. The Bourbon Red is considered a heritage turkey; it is an endangered breed, classified as 'watch' by the Livestock Conservancy. It was formerly known as the Bourbon Butternut or as the Kentucky Red.

History 

In the past, the breed has alternatively been called Kentucky Reds and Bourbon Butternuts. The bird originated in Kentucky and Pennsylvania in the late 19th century, and was created by crossing Buff, Standard Bronze, and White Holland turkeys. It was first recognized as a turkey variety by the American Poultry Association in 1909.

Bourbon Reds were selectively bred for utility traits as a meat bird, and were an important variety in the turkey industry throughout the 1930s and 1940s. Like most turkey breeds, it declined after the commercial adoption of the Broad Breasted White. Populations began to recover in the early 21st century, and today it is one of the most popular heritage turkey breeds in the U.S. Despite its relative popularity as a heritage breed, it is still listed as "watch" by the American Livestock Breeds Conservancy, indicating that there are fewer than 5,000 breeding birds in the U.S. The Bourbon Red is also included in Slow Food USA's Ark of Taste, a catalog of heritage American foods in danger of extinction.

It is recognized by the Entente Européenne in Europe, and by the Poultry Club of Great Britain. It is also reported from Australia, Canada and Uruguay.

Characteristics 

The breed standard indicates that mature Bourbon Red toms (males) weigh , and mature hens (females) weigh . These standard weights were published with anticipation of the potential of the Bourbon Red and when the breed was at its prime. Though there are efforts to restore and accomplish the Bourbon Red standard, today these weights are realized by few breeders and growers. Bourbon Reds have been unrefined for too long due to the lack of selective breeding to preserve the breed. However, mature turkeys in a breeding flock will fluctuate about 30 percent from these published weights due to their relentless, extensive, and highly instinctive breeding season, with their lowest weights typically being recorded in July.

The feathers are a dark base color, with white primaries in the tail characterized by a soft red band and white flight feathers; both the tail and wings feature chestnut coverts. The standard allows for a total of 30% red feathers in the tail before the bird is disqualified.

References 

Turkey breeds originating in the United States
Conservation Priority Breeds of the Livestock Conservancy
Animal breeds on the RBST Watchlist